Carnitas, literally meaning "little meats", is a dish of Mexican cuisine that originated in the state of Michoacán. Carnitas are made by braising or simmering pork in oil or preferably lard until tender. The process takes three to four hours, and the result is very tender and juicy meat, which is then typically served with chopped cilantro (coriander leaves), diced onion, salsa, guacamole, tortillas, and refried beans (frijoles refritos).

Description
Pork carnitas are traditionally made using the heavily marbled, rich Boston butt or picnic ham cuts of pork.  The 6–16 lb (3–7 kg) sections are usually cut down to a workable (6–10 lb) size and seasoned heavily before slow braising or deep frying.  Carnitas can also be made of chicken, using breasts or thighs, and cooking in a similar manner.  

The traditional way to cook carnitas is in a copper pot (or any thick-bottomed pot that disperses the heat evenly), in a process similar to  confit. Lard is used to cover the dish in proportion to the amount of meat being cooked. Once the lard has melted, pork and flavorings are added (usually salt, chili, cumin, oregano or Mexican oregano, marjoram, thyme, bay leaf, and crushed garlic cloves).  Traditional carnitas are then made by a process of simmering the meat in the lard until tender over a very low heat.  Once appropriate tenderness is achieved, the heat is turned up and the outside of the pork begins to crisp. At this stage, the collagen in the meat has broken down sufficiently to allow it to be pulled apart by hand or fork or chopped with a cleaver. The meat can then be used as an ingredient in tamales, tacos, tortas, and burritos.

See also

 Cochinita pibil
 Pulled pork
 List of Mexican dishes

References

External links
 Carnitas recipe

Mexican cuisine
Pork dishes